Cécile Alzina (born 25 June 1981) is a French snowboarder, born in Nice. She competed in women's halfpipe at the 2006 Winter Olympics in Turin.

References

External links

1981 births
Living people
Sportspeople from Nice
French female snowboarders
Olympic snowboarders of France
Snowboarders at the 2006 Winter Olympics
21st-century French women